In chemistry, an arene oxide is an epoxide of an arene.  Two important families of arene oxides are benzene oxides and naphthalene oxides as these are intermediates in the oxidative degradation of benzene and naphthalene, two common pollutants.  Benzopyrene is also converted to an epoxide, (+)-benzo[a]pyrene-7,8-epoxide.

Selected reactions
Benzene oxide (C6H6O) exists as an equilibrium mixture with the seven-membered ring oxepin, which has three double bonds. They are valence isomers and in equilibrium via disrotatory 6π ring closing and opening.

Arene oxides are highly reactive. Benzene oxide and naphthalene-1,2-oxide hydrate to give dihydroxydihydrobenzene and 1,2-dihydroxydihydronaphthalene, respectively.  The hydration is catalyzed by epoxide hydrolase enzymes.  Dehydration of these diols, which is driven by rearomatization, gives phenol and 1-naphthol. Oxidation of 1,2-dihydroxydihydronaphthalene, catalyzed by dihydrodiol dehydrogenase, gives the 1,2-naphthoquinone.

References

 
Human metabolites
Epoxides